Central Lyon Community School District is a rural public school district headquartered in Rock Rapids, Iowa. The district is completely within Lyon County, and serves Rock Rapids and the town Doon, and the surrounding rural areas.

Brent Jorth has served as superintendent since 2019.

Schools
The district operates three schools on a single campus at 1010 S. Greene Street, Rock Rapids:
 Central Lyon Senior High School
 Central Lyon Middle School
 Central Lyon Elementary School

Central Lyon Senior High School

Athletics
The Lions are members of the Siouxland Conference, and participate in the following sports:
Football
 4-time Class 2A State Champions (1976, 1977, 2006, 2022 (as Central Lyon-George-Little))
Cross Country
 Boys' 1969 State Champions (as Central Lyon), and 2017 Class 2A State Champions (as Central Lyon-George-Little)
Volleyball
Basketball
Girls' 2013 Class 1A State Champions 
Boys’ 2023 Class 2A State Champions
Wrestling
Golf
Soccer
Track and Field
 Girls' 2010 Class 1A State Champions
Baseball
Softball

See also
List of school districts in Iowa
List of high schools in Iowa

References

External links
 Central Lyon Community School District

School districts in Iowa
Education in Lyon County, Iowa